Idaho Falls is a city in and the county seat of Bonneville County, Idaho, United States. It is the state's largest city outside the Boise metropolitan area. As of the 2020 census, the population of Idaho Falls was 64,818. In the 2010 census, the population of Idaho Falls was 56,813 (2019 estimate: 62,888), with a metro population of 133,265.  
 
Idaho Falls serves as the commercial, cultural, and healthcare hub for Eastern Idaho, as well as parts of western Wyoming and southern Montana. It is served by the Idaho Falls Regional Airport and is home to the College of Eastern Idaho, Museum of Idaho, and the Idaho Falls Chukars minor league baseball team. It is the principal city of the Idaho Falls Metropolitan Statistical Area and the Idaho Falls–Blackfoot-Rexburg, Idaho Combined Statistical Area.

History

Montana Trail origins
The area around Idaho Falls was first sparsely settled by cattle and sheep ranchers. The ferry served a new tide of westward migration and travel on the Montana Trail following the Bear River Massacre of Shoshone Indians in 1863.

The bridge improved travel for settlers moving north and west, and for miners, freighters, and others seeking riches in the gold fields of Idaho and Montana—especially the boom towns of Bannack and Virginia City.

Eagle Rock
By the end of 1865, a private bank, small hotel, livery stable, eating house, post office, and stage station had sprung up near the bridge. The settlement was initially known as Taylor's Crossing, but postmarks indicate that by 1866, the emerging town had become known as Eagle Rock. The name was derived from an isolated basalt island in the river near the ferry, where approximately twenty eagles nested.

In 1874, water rights were established on nearby Willow Creek and the first grain was harvested. Settlement was sparse, and consisted of only a couple of families and small irrigation ditches. The first child of European descent was born at Eagle Rock in 1874.

Soon, the Utah and Northern Railway (U&NR) was built, stretching north from Utah through Eagle Rock and crossing the Snake River at the same narrow gorge as Taylor's bridge. The railway would eventually connect to the large new copper mines at Butte, Montana. The U&NR had the backing of robber baron Jay Gould, as Union Pacific Railroad had purchased it a few years prior. Grading crews reached Eagle Rock in late 1878, and by early 1879, a wild camp-town with dozens of tents and shanties had moved to Eagle Rock with a collection of saloons, dance halls, and gambling halls. The railroad company had 16 locomotives and 300 train cars working between Logan, Utah and the once-quiet stage stop. A new iron railroad bridge was fabricated in Athens, Pennsylvania at a cost of $30,000 and shipped by rail to the site, where it was erected in April and May 1879. The camp-town moved on, but Eagle Rock now had regular train service and several U&NR buildings, shops, and facilities which expanded and transformed the town.

As soon as the railroad came through, settlers began homesteading the upper Snake River Valley in earnest. The first new settlers carved out homesteads to the north at Egin (near present-day Parker) and at Pooles Island (near present-day Menan). The Utah & Northern Railway provided easy access, especially to homesteaders from Utah, who soon populated much of the area surrounding Eagle Rock. Some of these men had initially worked building the railroad, then later returned with their families to stake out new farms. These Utah families brought irrigation know-how developed in Utah's Great Basin settlements. Through their and others' canal systems, water from the Snake River made the Upper Snake River Valley into one of the most successful irrigation projects in the Mountain West. Large-scale settlement ensued and within a decade, there appeared roads, bridges, and dams, which brought most of the Upper Snake River Valley under cultivation.

Then, in 1887, following the construction of the Oregon Short Line and a railroad workers' strike in Eagle Rock, most of the railroad facilities were moved to Pocatello, where the new line branched off the U&NR. This caused a sharp and immediate drop in population, which nearly killed the town. In 1891, marketers convinced town leaders to change the name to Idaho Falls in reference to the rapids below the bridge. Some years later, the construction of a retaining wall for a hydroelectric power plant transformed the rapids into waterfalls. On June 22, 1895, the world's then-largest irrigation canal, the Great Feeder (located 5 miles northeast of Ririe), began diverting water from the Snake River, helping to convert tens of thousands of more acres of desert into green farmland. The area grew sugar beets, potatoes, peas, grains, and alfalfa, and became one of the most productive agricultural regions of the United States. The city once again began to flourish, growing continuously into the 20th century.

Nuclear reactors

In 1949, the Atomic Energy Commission opened the National Reactor Testing Station (NRTS) in the desert west of Idaho Falls. On December 20, 1951, a nuclear reactor there produced useful electricity for the first time in history. There have been more than 50 unique reactors built at the facility for testing—only three remain active.

On January 3, 1961, NRTS became the scene of the only fatal nuclear reactor incident in U.S. history. The event occurred at an experimental U.S. Army plant known as the Argonne Low-Power Reactor, which the Army called the Stationary Low-Power Reactor Number One (SL-1). Due to poor design and maintenance procedures, a single control rod was manually pulled out too far from the reactor, causing the reactor to become prompt critical, leading to a destructive power excursion. Three trained military men had been working inside the reactor room when a mistake was made while reattaching a control rod to its motor assembly. With the central control rod nearly fully extended, the nuclear reactor rated at 3 MW rapidly increased power to 20 GW. This rapidly boiled the water inside the core. As the steam expanded, a pressure wave of water forcefully struck the top of the reactor vessel, upon which two of the men stood. The explosion was so severe that the reactor vessel was propelled nine feet into the air, striking the ceiling before settling back into its original position. One man was impaled by a shield plug and lodged into the ceiling, where he died instantly. The other men died from their injuries within hours. The three men were buried in lead coffins, and that entire section of the site was buried. The core meltdown caused no damage to the area, although some radioactive nuclear fission products were released into the atmosphere.

The site has since developed into the Idaho National Laboratory (INL), a national laboratory operated by the United States Department of Energy. INL and its contractors are a major economic engine for the Idaho Falls area, employing more than 8,000 people between the desert site and its research and education campus in Idaho Falls. Among other projects, INL operates and manages the world-famous Advanced Test Reactor (ATR).

Geography

Natural disasters are rare in the area, although an F2 tornado hit the Idaho Falls area on April 7, 1978, causing up to $5 million in damage.

River Walk
Idaho Falls has an extensive river walk trail featuring running and bike trails, art installations, and points of interest along several miles of the Snake River. It is maintained by the city and periodically receives donations and grants that allow for expansion.

Neighborhoods
Notable Idaho Falls neighborhoods include:
 Downtown - Historic downtown Idaho Falls sits on several blocks of the original townsite along the east side of the river. It features restaurants, plazas, shops, and cultural amenities including the Museum of Idaho, Colonial Theatre, Art Museum of Eastern Idaho, Idaho Falls Public Library, and Japanese Friendship Garden. It is home to the Idaho Falls Farmers' Market and many other community events.
 The Numbered Streets - The numbered streets area was the first planned neighborhood in Idaho Falls. The streets run west and east between South Boulevard and Holmes Avenue. Traffic on the odd-numbered streets travels east, and west on the even-numbered streets. Kate Curley Park is located in the neighborhood, as is the Wesley W. Deist Aquatic Center and the Eleventh Street Historic District.
 West Side - The West Side houses Idaho Falls Regional Airport and I-15. It has retained more of a small-town feel than the east side, which has grown and developed much more rapidly since the 1980s.
 Snake River Landing - SRL is a large, mixed-use development on the west side of the river near I-15, which includes residential, restaurant, park, and community event space, including a planned mid-sized indoor arena. It now hosts the Melaleuca Freedom Celebration, a large Independence Day event.

Climate
Idaho Falls experiences a humid continental climate with warm summers and cold winters (Köppen Dfb). Precipitation is relatively sparse, but not low enough to classify the climate as semi-arid.

Demographics

2010 census
As of the census of 2010, there were 56,813 people, 21,203 households, and 14,510 families residing in the city. The racial makeup of the city was 89.3% White, 0.7% African American, 1.0% Native American, 1.0% Asian, 0.1% Pacific Islander, 5.6% from other races, and 2.3% from two or more races. Hispanic or Latino of any race were 12.9% of the population.

There were 21,203 households, of which 37.1% had children under the age of 18 living with them, 52.4% were married couples living together, 11.3% had a female householder with no husband present, 4.7% had a male householder with no wife present, and 31.6% were non-families. 26.5% of all households were made up of individuals, and 9.7% had someone living alone who was 65 years of age or older. The average household size was 2.63 and the average family size was 3.20.

The median age in the city was 32.2 years. 29.3% of residents were under the age of 18; 9.2% were between the ages of 18 and 24; 26.5% were from 25 to 44; 23.4% were from 45 to 64; and 11.8% were 65 years of age or older. The gender makeup of the city was 49.5% male and 50.5% female.

2000 census
The 2000 census reported there were 50,730 people, 18,793 households, and 13,173 families residing in the city. The racial makeup of the city was 92.09% White, 0.62% African American, 0.76% Native American, 1.05% Asian, 0.06% Pacific Islander, 3.81% from other races, and 1.61% from two or more races. Hispanic or Latino of any race were 7.18% of the population.

There were 18,793 households, out of which 37.5% had children under the age of 18 living with them, 56.5% were married couples living together, 10.2% had a female householder with no husband present, and 29.9% were non-families. 25.3% of all households were made up of individuals, and 9.1% had someone living alone who was 65 years of age or older. The average household size was 2.65 and the average family size was 3.21.

In the city, the population was spread out, with 30.3% under the age of 18, 10.1% from 18 to 24, 27.6% from 25 to 44, 20.9% from 45 to 64, and 11.1% who were 65 years of age or older. The median age was 32 years. For every 100 females, there were 97.9 males. For every 100 females age 18 and over, there were 94.8 males.

The median income for a household in the city was $40,512, and the median income for a family was $47,431. Males had a median income of $39,082 versus $23,001 for females. The per capita income for the city was $18,857. About 7.8% of families and 10.9% of the population were below the poverty line, including 12.7% of those under age 18 and 6.3% of those age 65 or over.

The top five ethnic groups in Idaho Falls are:
 English - 22%
 German - 16%
 Irish - 7%
 Mexican - 5%
 Swedish - 4%

Economy
Idaho Falls serves as a regional hub for health care, travel, and business in eastern Idaho.

The community's economy was mostly agriculturally focused until the opening of the National Reactor Testing Station in the desert west of Idaho Falls in 1949. The city subsequently became largely dependent on high-income jobs from the Idaho National Laboratory (INL), known locally simply as "The Site." Since the 1990s, the city has added a significant retail, entertainment, and restaurant sector, as well as a regional medical center.

Idaho Falls hosts the headquarters of the United Potato Growers of Idaho and District 7 of the Idaho Department of Health and Welfare. It is the home to several small-to-medium-sized national corporations such as North Wind, Inc. and Melaleuca, Inc.

The median home price in Idaho Falls was $224,800 in January 2007.

Idaho Falls, Idaho / U.S. average:
 Area population 122,995 / 647,500
 Median home price $224,800 / $235,000
 Cost-of-living index 99.8 / 100.0
 Unemployment rate 2.7% / 4.6%
 Job growth—5 years 18.84% / 4.90%
 Job growth—1 year 2.74% / 1.66%
 Median household income $47,719 / $46,326

Arts and culture

The Willard Arts Center, The Colonial Theatre and Civic Auditorium host musical concerts, plays, and events.

The Museum of Idaho showcases local artifacts and history. It also brings in major traveling exhibits such as fossilized dinosaurs, Gutenberg Bibles, Titanic remnants, and "Bodies: the Exhibition."

Downtown Idaho Falls once struggled as the city expanded eastward, but it has been revitalized in recent years due to the efforts of local business owners, the City of Idaho Falls, and other organizations such as the Downtown Development Corporation and the Idaho Falls Chamber of Commerce. Today, it is home to a handful of locally owned shops, stores, restaurants, galleries, theaters, and future revitalization efforts.

The city attracts many tourists visiting nearby Yellowstone and Grand Teton National Parks, Craters of the Moon National Monument and Preserve, Jackson Hole, and fishing on the Snake River.

Parks and recreation
There are three 18-hole golf courses in Idaho Falls, and four disc golf courses.

Education

Higher education
The College of Eastern Idaho was established in 1969 as a vocational-technical college named Eastern Idaho Technical College.  In 2017 it transitioned into Eastern Idaho's only community college.

Stevens-Henager College has a resource center in the city to aid students in online degree programs.

A campus of the University of Idaho in Idaho Falls provides access to the university's resources.

Primary and secondary education

Schools located in Idaho Falls administered by the Idaho Falls School District #91 include:

 A.H. Bush Elementary School Logo
 Career Technical Education
 Compass Academy
 Dora Erickson Elementary School
 Eagle Rock Middle School
 Edgemont Elementary School
 Ethel Boyes Elementary School
 Fox Hollow Elementary School
 Hawthorne Elementary School
 Idaho Falls High School
 Linden Park Elementary School
 Longfellow Elementary School
 Skyline High School
 Sunnyside Elementary School
 Taylorview Middle School 
 Temple View Elementary School 
 Theresa Bunker Elementary School
 Westside Elementary School
 

Schools located in Idaho Falls administered by the Bonneville Joint School District #93 include:

 Black Canyon Middle School 
 Bonneville Online High School 
 Bridgewater Elementary School 
 Cloverdale Elementary School 
 Discovery Elementary School 
 Fairview Elementary School 
 Falls Valley Elementary School 
 Praxium Mastery Academy 
 Summit Hills Elementary School 
 Tiebreaker Elementary School 
 Ucon Elementary School
 

Each fall, the varsity football teams of Idaho Falls and Skyline compete in a rival football game called the Emotion Bowl. Each year, after the game, the winning team and its fans traditionally paint the goalposts of the stadium in their school colors (orange for Idaho Falls and blue for Skyline). Bonneville and Hillcrest participate in a similar event known as the Civil War.

Media 
The Post Register, a daily newspaper, serves the Idaho Falls area. The area is also served by seven radio stations. The Idaho Falls/Pocatello region is served by five major television stations. There are four major news outlets in the area: KIDK (Dabl, also broadcast on sister Fox station KXPI-LD), KIFI-TV (ABC/CBS), KPVI-DT (NBC, licensed to Pocatello), and Idaho Public Television. Online media outlet East Idaho News also serves the area with news coverage.

Notable people

 Chandler Brossard - beat novelist, author of Who Walk in Darkness
 Gregory C. Carr - telecommunications entrepreneur and philanthropist; head of Gorongosa National Park restoration in Mozambique
 Steven E. Carr - only American ever elected to Standing Commission of International Red Cross and Red Crescent Movement, organization's highest governing body worldwide
 Barzilla W. Clark - Governor of Idaho 1937–1939. Mayor of Idaho Falls 1913–15, 1926–36
 Bethine Clark Church - Scion of the Clark family and wife of Frank Church
 Chase A. Clark - Governor of Idaho 1941-1942. Mayor of Idaho Falls 1937-1938. U.S. district judge 1943-1966
 D. Worth Clark - U.S. Senator 1939-1945. U.S. Congressman 1935-1939
 Mike Crapo - U.S. Senator 1999-present. U.S. Congressman 1993-1999
 Dame Darcy - avant-garde cartoonist and author of Meatcake
 Jared Gold - fashion designer, featured on America's Next Top Model
 Gregg Hale - guitar player for multi-platinum selling British band Spiritualized
 Michael Jon Hand - former CIA operative, arms dealer, drug dealer and international fugitive; co-founder of the defunct Nugan Hand Bank
 Orval H. Hansen - U.S. Congressman 1969-1975
 Mary Kornman - actress, best known for Our Gang comedies
 Rachel Martin - NPR journalist, host of Morning Edition
 Janice McGeachin - Lieutenant Governor of Idaho 2019–2023
 Edgar Miller - designer and artist
 David Neiwert - freelance journalist and blogger
 Yo Murphy - former CFL/NFL wide receiver; played at Idaho Falls High School
 Ryan Nelson - federal judge, U.S. Court of Appeals for the Ninth Circuit (2018–present)
 Martha Raddatz - ABC News Chief Global Affairs Correspondent, recipient of 4 Emmy Awards
 Wilson Rawls - author of Where the Red Fern Grows and Summer of the Monkeys
 Brandi Sherwood - Miss Idaho Teen USA 1989, Miss Teen USA 1989, Miss Idaho USA 1997, Miss USA 1997 (succeeded)
 John L. Smith - head football coach at Michigan State, Louisville, Utah State, Idaho, and Arkansas
 Frank L. VanderSloot - businessman, owner of Melaleuca Inc., a home-goods/health-product marketing company; national finance co-chair for Mitt Romney's 2012 presidential campaign

Sister city
Idaho Falls has a sister city, as designated by Sister Cities International:
  Tokai, Ibaraki, Japan

Gallery

References

External links

 Idaho Falls Public Library
 Idaho Falls Chamber Of Commerce
 Idaho Falls Convention And Visitors Bureau
 

 
Cities in Idaho
Cities in Bonneville County, Idaho
County seats in Idaho
Populated places established in 1864
Cities in Idaho Falls metropolitan area